Teretiopsis is a genus of sea snails, marine gastropod mollusks in the family Raphitomidae.

Species
Species within the genus Teretiopsis include:
 Teretiopsis abyssalis Kantor & Sysoev, 1989
 Teretiopsis hyalina Sysoev & Bouchet, 2001
 Teretiopsis levicarinatus Kantor & Sysoev, 1989
 Teretiopsis nodicarinatus Kantor & Sysoev, 1989
 Teretiopsis thaumastopsis (Dautzenberg & Fischer H., 1896)
Synonyms
 Teretiopsis levicarinatus Kantor & Sysoev, 1989: synonym of Teretiopsis levicarinata Kantor & Sysoev, 1989 (wrong gender agreement of specific epithet)
 Teretiopsis nodicarinatus Kantor & Sysoev, 1989: synonym of Teretiopsis nodicarinata Kantor & Sysoev, 1989 (wrong gender agreement of specific epithet)

References

External links
 Kantor, Yu I., and A. V. Sysoev. "The morphology of toxoglossan gastropods lacking a radula, with a description of new species and genus of Turridae." Journal of Molluscan Studies 55.4 (1989): 537-549
 
 Worldwide Mollusc Species Data Base: Raphitomidae

 
Raphitomidae
Gastropod genera